The Eye of the Government is a 1914 American silent film produced by Gene Gauntier Feature Players and distributed by Warner's Features. It was directed by Sidney Olcott with himself, Gene Gauntier and Jack J Clark in the leading roles.

Cast
 Gene Gauntier
 Jack J. Clark
 Sidney Olcott

Production notes
The film was shot in Ireland and on board a liner on the Atlantic Ocean.

References
 Michel Derrien, Aux origines du cinéma irlandais: Sidney Olcott, le premier oeil, TIR 2013.  
 The Moving Picture World, Vol 19, p 1161

External links

  The Eye of the Government website dedicated to Sidney Olcott

1914 films
Silent American drama films
American silent short films
American black-and-white films
Films set in Ireland
Films shot in Ireland
Films directed by Sidney Olcott
1914 short films
1914 drama films
1910s American films